Philip Walter Threlfall (born 11 February 1967) is a former English cricketer.  Threlfall was a right-handed batsman who bowled right-arm medium-fast.  He was born at Barrow-in-Furness, Lancashire.

Threfall played for Cumberland in 1987, making a single appearance in the Minor Counties Championship against Cambridgeshire and a single appearance in the MCCA Knockout Trophy against Cheshire.  In 1988, Threfall played Second XI cricket for Sussex, with him also making his first-class debut for the county in that season against Somerset at the Recreation Ground, Bath.  He played regularly for the Sussex Second XI, but would only make two further first-class appearances for the county, against the touring Sri Lankans in 1990 and Cambridge University in 1991.  He never batted in his three first-class appearances, but with the ball he took 7 wickets at an average of 18.57, with best figures of 3/45.  He also made a single List A appearance for the county against the touring Zimbabweans in 1990.  He ended Sussex's innings of 233/8 unbeaten on 17, while in the Zimbabweans innings he took figures of 3/40 from 10 overs, with Sussex winning by 95 runs.  He continued to play for the Sussex Second XI until 1994.

References

External links
Philip Threlfall at ESPNcricinfo
Philip Threlfall at CricketArchive

1967 births
Living people
Sportspeople from Barrow-in-Furness
Cricketers from Cumbria
English cricketers
Cumberland cricketers
Sussex cricketers